Kim Ho-Jun (born 21 June 1984) is a South Korean football player who plays for Bucheon FC 1995.

His debut was a match against Daejeon Citizen in 2005.

Club career statistics

External links

1985 births
Living people
Association football goalkeepers
South Korean footballers
FC Seoul players
Jeju United FC players
Gimcheon Sangmu FC players
Gangwon FC players
K League 1 players